Edijs Brahmanis (born November 17, 1983 in Riga, Soviet Union) is a Latvian ice hockey left winger, currently playing for HK Olimp/Venta 2002 of the Latvian Hockey Higher League.

In 2004-05, while playing for ASK/Ogre, he was the top goal scorer of Latvian league. During 2008-09 Brahmanis also played four games for the Kontinental Hockey League club Dinamo Riga.

External links
 

1983 births
Living people
Latvian ice hockey left wingers
ASK/Ogre players
Basingstoke Bison players
Dinamo Riga players
Arystan Temirtau players
Saryarka Karagandy players
ETC Crimmitschau players
HK Liepājas Metalurgs players
HK Riga 2000 players
HK Zemgale players
Prizma Riga players
HK Gomel players
HC Shakhtyor Soligorsk players